Dalibor Pauletić (born 27 October 1978) is a Croatian football defender, who most notably played for Prva HNL side NK Istra 1961, where he was a captain.

Career
Pauletić had a spell in Iceland with KR Reykjavík.

Honours
Istra 1961
Druga HNL - South: 2002-03
Druga HNL: 2008-09

References

External links
Dalibor Pauletić profile at Nogometni Magazin 

1978 births
Living people
Sportspeople from Pula
Association football defenders
Croatian footballers
NK Pazinka players
HNK Rijeka players
NK Istra 1961 players
Knattspyrnufélag Reykjavíkur players
Croatian Football League players
First Football League (Croatia) players
Úrvalsdeild karla (football) players
Croatian expatriate footballers
Expatriate footballers in Iceland
Croatian expatriate sportspeople in Iceland